Antonina Alexandrovna Seredina (23 December 1929 – 2 September 2016) was a Russian sprint canoeist. She won the 500 m singles and doubles events at the 1960 Olympics, and placed third in the doubles in 1968 and fourth in 1964. She also won five medals at the ICF Canoe Sprint World Championships with two golds (K-4 500 m: 1963, 1966) and three silvers (K-1 500 m: 1958, K-2 500 m: 1958, 1966).

References

External links

1929 births
2016 deaths
Canoeists at the 1960 Summer Olympics
Canoeists at the 1964 Summer Olympics
Canoeists at the 1968 Summer Olympics
Olympic canoeists of the Soviet Union
Olympic gold medalists for the Soviet Union
Olympic bronze medalists for the Soviet Union
Soviet female canoeists
Olympic medalists in canoeing
Russian female canoeists
ICF Canoe Sprint World Championships medalists in kayak
Honoured Masters of Sport of the USSR

Medalists at the 1968 Summer Olympics
Medalists at the 1960 Summer Olympics
Sportspeople from Tver Oblast